Neo Turf Masters is a golf video game by Nazca for the Neo Geo, released in 1996. This is also one of the first two titles by Nazca, the other being the popular Metal Slug before being acquired by SNK.

The game was released as an arcade cartridge (MVS) and as home cartridge (AES), as well as for the Neo Geo CD console. The Neo Geo version was later re-released as part of the SNK Arcade Classics Vol. 1 compilation for the PS2, Wii and PSP, as well as for the Wii Virtual Console. The game has also been ported to the PlayStation 4, Xbox One, and Nintendo Switch by Hamster Corporation as part of their Arcade Archives series (under the title Big Tournament Golf).

A version for the Neo Geo Pocket Color was later released in North America in 1999. The NGPC version features cartoonish, less detailed graphics compared to the Neo Geo version which had partially digitized sprites and realistic art.

Gameplay

The game is a fast-paced, arcade-style golf game. Players choose from two game modes, stroke play for one or two players, and match play for two players only.

Competing on one of four fictional golf courses located in the United States, Japan, Australia and Germany, players choose from one of six players with different attributes:

Unlike many golf games of the era which used a two-click swing system to determine the hook or slice of the ball, Neo Turf Masters uses a single click for the power of the shot, and a second for the height of the shot; hook and slice are selected with buttons B and C before making the shot.  This makes the game much easier to pick up and play than its more technically demanding contemporaries, but it compensates for this reduced difficulty with fiendish (if somewhat unrealistic) course layouts and highly variable wind.

Reception
In Japan, Game Machine listed Neo Turf Masters on their March 15, 1996 issue as being the twelfth most-successful arcade game of the month.

IGN gave the Virtual Console release of the game 7.5 out of 10 stating "If you're the type of gamer who appreciates SNK's arcade style and can jibe with the idea of juiced-up, high-speed golf, Neo Turf might be well worth your 900 Wii Points".

Notes

References

External links 
 Neo Turf Masters at GameFAQs
 Neo Turf Masters at Giant Bomb
 Neo Turf Masters at Killer List of Videogames
 Neo Turf Masters at MobyGames

1996 video games
ACA Neo Geo games
Arcade video games
D4 Enterprise games
Golf video games
Nazca Corporation games
Neo Geo games
Neo Geo CD games
Neo Geo Pocket Color games
Multiplayer and single-player video games
Nintendo Switch games
PlayStation Network games
PlayStation 4 games
SNK games
SNK Playmore games
Video games scored by Masahiko Hataya
Video games scored by Takushi Hiyamuta
Virtual Console games
Video games developed in Japan
Xbox One games
Hamster Corporation games